Stacy Madeleine Schiff (born October 26, 1961) is an American former editor, essayist, and author of five biographies. Her biography of Vera Nabokov won the 2000 Pulitzer Prize in biography. Schiff has also written biographies of French aviator and author of The Little Prince, Antoine de Saint-Exupéry, colonial American-era polymath and prime mover of America's founding, Benjamin Franklin, Franklin's fellow Founding Father Samuel Adams, ancient Egyptian queen Cleopatra, and the important figures and events of the Salem Witch Trials of 1692–93 in colonial Massachusetts.

Early life and career 
Schiff was born in Adams, Massachusetts, to Morton Schiff, the president of Schiff Clothing, a store founded by Schiff's great-grandfather in 1897, and Ellen, a professor of French literature at North Adams State college (now called Massachusetts College of Liberal Arts).  Schiff graduated from Phillips Academy (Andover) preparatory school, and subsequently earned her B.A. degree from Williams College in 1982. She was a senior editor at Simon & Schuster until 1990.

Career as author 
Schiff won the 2000 Pulitzer Prize for Biography or Autobiography for Vera, a biography of Vera Nabokov, the wife and muse of the Russian-American novelist Vladimir Nabokov. She was also a finalist for the 1995 Pulitzer Prize for Biography or Autobiography for Saint-Exupéry: A Biography of Antoine de Saint Exupéry.

Schiff's A Great Improvisation: Franklin, France, and the Birth of America (2005) won the George Washington Book Prize. It is being made into Franklin, an upcoming miniseries starring Michael Douglas.

Her fourth book, Cleopatra: A Life, was published in 2010. As the Wall Street Journal's reviewer put it, "Schiff does a rare thing: She gives us a book we'd miss if it didn't exist." The New Yorker termed the book "a work of literature;" Simon Winchester predicted "it will become a classic." Cleopatra appeared on The New York Times's Top Ten Books of 2010, and won the 2011 PEN/Jacqueline Bograd Weld Award for biography.

Schiff's The Witches: Salem, 1692 was published in 2015. The New York Times described it as "an almost novelistic, thriller-like narrative." David McCullough declared the book "brilliant from start to finish."

Her essays and articles have appeared in The New Yorker, The New York Times, The New York Review of Books, The Times Literary Supplement, and The Washington Post. A former guest columnist at The New York Times, Schiff resides in New York City and is a trustee of the John Simon Guggenheim Memorial Foundation.

Awards and honors 
 National Endowment for the Humanities, fellowship
 1996 John Simon Guggenheim Memorial Foundation, fellowship
 2000 Pulitzer Prize, Vera (Mrs. Vladimir Nabokov)
 2006 George Washington Book Prize, "A Great Improvisation"
 2015 Lapham's Quarterly Janus Prize
 2017 New England Historic Genealogical Society Lifetime Achievement Award in History and Biography
2018 French Ministry of Culture, Chevalier des Arts et Lettres
2019 American Academy of Arts and Letters

Works

Books 

 
(Nominated for the 1995 Pulitzer Prize)
 
(Winner of 2000 Pulitzer Prize)
  (Published in the UK as Dr Franklin Goes to France)

Columns and Reviews

See also 
 Essjay controversy

References

External links 
"An Interview with Stacy Schiff"  by Suellen Stringer-Hye, published in April 1999 by Random House.

Q&A interview with Schiff, November 6, 2011
Interview with Schiff on "New Books in Biography"
Stacy Schiff, The Art of Biography No. 6 Paris Review, Winter 2017

1961 births
Living people
People from Adams, Massachusetts
American biographers
American book editors
21st-century American historians
Writers from New York (state)
Phillips Academy alumni
Pulitzer Prize for Biography or Autobiography winners
Williams College alumni
American women historians
American women biographers
American women journalists
21st-century American women writers
Women autobiographers
Members of the American Academy of Arts and Letters
Historians of the American Revolution
American Egyptologists
Historians of the Thirteen Colonies